Rubayat (also Romanized as Rūbayāt, Roba‘īyāt, Roobyet, and Rūbiāt) is a village in Barakuh Rural District, Jolgeh-e Mazhan District, Khusf County, South Khorasan Province, Iran. At the 2006 census, its population was 229, in 76 families.

References 

Populated places in Khusf County